Anna Carin Pernilla Hjalmarsson Koch (née Hjalmarsson; born 23 February 1971) is a Swedish professional golfer who previously played on the Ladies European Tour and on the U.S.-based LPGA Tour. She was captain of the 2015 European Solheim Cup team.

Amateur career
Carin Koch had a successful amateur career. She represented Gullbringa Golf & Country Club, in Kungälv, north of Gothenburg, Sweden, just as elder Swedish female stars Kärstin Ehrnlund and Helen Alfredsson. She was the 1988 Swedish Junior 18 Match-play Champion. She represented Sweden on both junior level and in the national amateur team during the period 1985–1991. She was part of the winning Swedish team at the 1990 European Lady Junior's Team Championship at Shannon Golf Club on Ireland, with, among others, Annika Sörenstam.

Koch enrolled at the University of Tulsa and was named Second-Team All-American in 1990 and Scholar All-American in 1991.

Between 1987 and 1991 she played eight times on the Swedish Golf Tour, at the time named the Telia Tour, as an amateur, never finishing outside the top ten.  She turned professional in 1992.

Professional career
1992 was her rookie year on the Ladies European Tour. She won the Swedish Golf Tour (at the time named the Telia Tour) Order of Merit in both 1992  and 1993, winning three tournaments each year.

In 1994, she finished fourth on the Asian Order of Merit and tied for fifth at the LPGA Final Qualifying Tournament to earn exempt status for the 1995 LPGA season.

In 1995, her rookie season, her best LPGA finish was a tie for second at the JAL Big Apple Classic. She also gained two top ten finishes on the Ladies European Tour. In 1996 she almost gained her maiden LPGA victory, losing the Edina Realty Classic to Liselotte Neumann in a playoff.

In the 1999 Jamie Farr Kroger Classic, Koch had a two shot lead with just the final hole to play. Her caddie gave her the wrong club and she made a double bogey to drop into a six-way sudden death playoff, won by Se Ri Pak. In 2000, Koch won her maiden European title at the 2000 Chrysler Open.  She was a member of the victorious European Solheim Cup Team, where she went 3-0 as a "rookie" and sank an eight-foot birdie putt on the 17th hole to win her match against Michele Redman to clinch the European Team's victory. She also teamed with Sophie Gustafson to win the inaugural TSN Ladies' World Cup of Golf.

In 2001, she became an LPGA maiden winner at the LPGA Corning Classic. At the start of 2002, Carin topped a Playboy internet poll as the sexiest women on the LPGA but declined to pose for them nude. This was the year Koch recorded a career-best 13 top-10 finishes, including three runner-up finishes and was a captain's pick for the European Solheim Cup team. In 2003, Koch gave birth to her second child, but still played well enough to be a captain's pick for the 2003 Solheim Cup, won by the Europeans in her native Sweden.

In 2005, she won her second career LPGA event at the Corona Morelia Championship. and was again a captain's pick for the 2005 Solheim Cup. She teamed up with Sophie Gustafson to represent Sweden at the inaugural Women's World Cup of Golf and was also a member of the International team at the inaugural Lexus Cup. She also played in the 2007 Women's World Cup of Golf with Helen Alfredsson.

In April 2014, Koch was named European team captain for the 2015 Solheim Cup. The 2015 match, played at Golf Club St. Leon-Rot, Germany, ended in a U.S. win 14½–13½, after a strong American come-back the last day.

In 2021 Koch fulfilled the age requirement for the U.S. Senior Women's Open, and gained exemption by virtue of her position on the LPGA Tour all-time money list.

Personal life
In 2014, Koch became an honorary member of Hills Golf and Sports Club in Mölndal, south of Gothenburg, Sweden, were she was appointed head of the Hills Business Club.

She was formerly married to golf professional Stefan Koch. During her LPGA Tour career, they lived in Phoenix, Arizona, United States, with their two children, Oliver and Simzon. She now lives in Mölndal, Sweden and uses her maiden name Carin Hjalmarsson.

Amateur wins
1988 Swedish Junior Under 19 Championship

Professional wins (10)

LPGA Tour wins (2)

LPGA Tour playoff record (0–2)

Ladies European Tour wins (1)

Swedish Golf Tour wins (6)

Other wins (1)
2000 TSN Ladies World Cup Golf (with Sophie Gustafson)

Results in LPGA majors

^ The Women's British Open replaced the du Maurier Classic as an LPGA major in 2001.

CUT = missed the half-way cut.
"T" tied

Summary
Starts – 58 
Wins – 0
2nd-place finishes – 0
3rd-place finishes – 0
Top 3 finishes – 0
Top 5 finishes – 2
Top 10 finishes – 7
Top 25 finishes – 19
Missed cuts – 21
Most consecutive cuts made – 9
Longest streak of top-10s – 2 (twice)

LPGA Tour career summary

Team appearances
Amateur
European Lady Junior's Team Championship (representing Sweden): 1988, 1990 (winners)
European Ladies' Team Championship (representing Sweden): 1989, 1991

Professional
Solheim Cup (representing Europe): 2000 (winners), 2002, 2003 (winners), 2005, 2015 (non-playing captain)
Lexus Cup (representing International team): 2005 (winners), 2006
World Cup (representing Sweden): 2005, 2007

Solheim Cup record

Notes and references

External links

Swedish female golfers
Tulsa Golden Hurricane women's golfers
Ladies European Tour golfers
LPGA Tour golfers
Solheim Cup competitors for Europe
Sportspeople from Västra Götaland County
People from Kungälv Municipality
1971 births
Living people